The 1985–86 FC Bayern Munich season was the 86th season in the club's history and 21st season since promotion from Regionalliga Süd in 1965.  Bayern Munich won its eighth Bundesliga title.  This title marked a back-to-back championship for the club.  The club also won the DFB-Pokal and reached the quarterfinals of the European Cup  This season, Frank Hartmann, Hansi Flick, and Helmut Winklhofer transferred to the club while Manfred Schwabl was promoted from the Junior Team.

Results

Friendlies

Santiago Bernabéu Cup

Bundesliga

League fixtures and results

Results by round

League table

DFB Pokal

European Cup

1st round

2nd round

Quarter-finals

Players

Squad, appearances and goals 

|}

Goals

Bookings

Transfers

In
First Team

Out
First Team

References 

FC Bayern Munich seasons
Bayern Munich
German football championship-winning seasons